The Republic of West Papua is a proposed country consisting of the Western New Guinea region, which is currently part of Indonesia in the continent of Oceania. The region has been part of Indonesia since 1 May 1963 under several names in the following order, West Irian, Irian Jaya, and Papua. Today the region comprises six Indonesian provinces: Papua, Central Papua, Highland Papua, South Papua, West Papua, and Southwest Papua.

The proposal is supported by Solomon Islands and Vanuatu with the Parliament of Vanuatu passing the Wantok Blong Yumi Bill (Our Close Friends) in 2010 officially declaring that Vanuatu's foreign policy is to support the achievement of the independence of West Papua. The parliament has proposed requesting that West Papua be granted observer status at the Melanesian Spearhead Group and Pacific Island Forum.

The Republic of West Papua has been a member state of the Unrepresented Nations and Peoples Organization (UNPO) since the organization's founding in 1991.

History
The region was previously mostly unclaimed, with the coastal regions and surrounding islands having a trading relationship with both the Sultanate of Tidore and the Sultanate of Ternate. Under the 1660 treaty between the Sultanate of Tidore and the Sultanate of Ternate which was under Dutch colony the Papuan people are recognized as subjects of Tidore sultanate. Under the 1872 treaty, the Sultanate of Tidore recognized Dutch control over its entire territory, which was used by the Kingdom of the Netherlands to establish West Papua as a formal colony part of the Dutch East Indies. For most of the colonial rule, there was no distinction made between Moluccans and Papuan. With parts of New Guinea is ruled administratively under Residentie Amboina. In 1922, Residentie Ternate was combined with Residentie Amboina and renamed Residentie Molukken. In 1935 the Residentie was renamed Gouvernement Molukken until the creation of Gouvernement Groote Oost in 1938, in which Gouvernement Molukken became residentie again. Under Dutch colonialism, West New Guinea is separated into two afdeeling, Afdeeling Nieuw-Guinea, and Afdeeling Zuid Nieuw-Guinea.

In 1949 after the Round Table conference, Netherlands kept part of its colony with the West New Guinea region known as Dutch New Guinea. The Dutch planned to settle most of its mixed population from Dutch East Indies in West New Guinea. When that plan failed, the Dutch had planned to withdraw by 1970 and began "Papuanization" to prepare for independence. In February 1961, the Dutch organised elections for the New Guinea Council a Papuan representative body to advise the Governor. The Council appointed a National Committee to prepare a political manifesto for the future state. On 1 December 1961, an inauguration ceremony was held for the Morning Star flag raised outside the Council building in the presence of the Governor, also the national anthem "Hai Tanahku Papua", the birds of paradise coat of arms, motto and the name of Papua Barat (West Papua) for the proposed new state. The Dutch had accepted the Manifesto except the denomination of the flag recognizing it as a territorial flag not a national flag.

The Dutch continued the formation of a council on October 19, 1961 which drafted the Manifesto for Independence and Self-Government, the national flag (the Morning Star Flag), the national stamp, the birds of paradise coat of arms, motto and the name of Papua Barat (West Papua), chose "Hai Tanahku Papua" as the national anthem, and asked people to be recognized as Papuans. The Dutch recognized this flag and song on November 18, 1961 and these regulations came into force on December 1, 1961. The Dutch stated that they had accepted the Manifesto except for the denomination of the flag recognizing it as a territorial flag, not a national flag.

On 1 July 1971, Brigadier General Seth Jafeth Rumkorem, a former member of Indonesian military cadet and son of an Indonesian military officer, defected and became the leader of the militant independence movement Free Papua Movement, proclaimed unilaterally West Papua as an independent democratic republic. The Morning Star flag was declared as a national flag.

On 14 December 1988, Thom Wainggai unilaterally proclaimed the Republic of West Melanesia using the Melanesian identity of the West Papuan people the name. The West Melanesia flag featured 14 stars with three colored bars of black, red and white.

On 19 October 2011, Forkorus Yaboisembut, the head of the West Papua National Authority (WPNA), proclaimed the Federal Republic of West Papua with the Mambruk pigeon as the symbol of state.

In December 2014, all West Papuan independence movement groups were united under a single umbrella organization the United Liberation Movement for West Papua (ULMWP). The organization is chaired by Benny Wenda. In July 2019, the ULMWP claimed to have earlier in May united all West Papuan military factions under the one command forming the West Papua Army, including the West Papua National Liberation Army (TPNPB), that would be under "the political leadership of the ULMWP". The TPNPB released a statement in response denying that it had merged and called for a retraction and apology and said it had withdrawn from the ULMWP following a ULMWP summit in Vanuatu in 2017. On 1 December 2020, the ULMWP announced it was forming a provisional government for the Republic of West Papua with a provisional constitution and with Benny Wenda as interim president.

See also

Act of Free Choice
New York Agreement
Papua conflict
United Nations Temporary Executive Authority
West Papua Revolutionary Army
Republic of South Maluku, a defunct, but similar unrecognised quasi-state in Indonesia

References

Notes

Further reading
Bertrand, Jaques (1997). "Business as Usual" in Suharto's Indonesia. Asian Survey 37(6):441-452.
Brad Simpson. Indonesia's 1969 Takeover of West Papua Not by "Free Choice". The National Security Archive, George Washington University.

External links

Free West Papua Campaign
West Papua Media Alerts website
United Nations – West New Guinea UNSF
An article about the history of West Papuan separatism by John Anari (United Nations website)

Politics of Indonesia
Organizations based in Papua (province)
Proposed countries
Separatism in Indonesia
Independence movements
Western New Guinea